Sesto ed Uniti is a comune (municipality) in the Province of Cremona in the Italian region Lombardy, located about  southeast of Milan and about  northwest of Cremona.

Sesto ed Uniti borders the following municipalities: Acquanegra Cremonese, Annicco, Castelverde, Cremona, Grumello Cremonese ed Uniti, Paderno Ponchielli, Spinadesco.

Notable people 
 Former mayor of Bologna and former trade union leader Sergio Cofferati
 Chef Massimo Capra

References

Cities and towns in Lombardy